George Griffin may refer to:

 George C. Griffin (1897–1990), served in various positions at the Georgia Institute of Technology
 George Griffin (butler), African-American employee of Mark Twain
 George Griffin (rugby league) (born 1992), rugby league player for Salford Red Devils
 George Griffin (animator) (born 1943), American animator
 George Griffin (author) (1778–1860), American lawyer and author.

See also
George Griffith (disambiguation)